Mohit Kale (born 27 November 1996) is an Indian cricketer. He made his first-class debut for Vidarbha in the 2018–19 Ranji Trophy on 28 November 2018.

References

External links
 

1996 births
Living people
Indian cricketers
Place of birth missing (living people)
Vidarbha cricketers